Burned Bridges/I'm Giving Up on This One is a split EP between American bands The Get Up Kids and Coalesce. The album was released on colored vinyl in 1996 on Second Nature Recordings. There were 13 different pressings of the album, with each pressing on different colored vinyl. The album is unique in that each band picked one of the other band's songs to cover in their own style. The Get Up Kids covered the song "Harvest of Maturity" from Coalesce's self-titled debut album, and Coalesce covered "Second Place" from The Get Up Kids' Woodson EP. The album was recorded at Red House Studios in Eudora, Kansas and produced by Ed Rose, who would also go on to produce several other albums by both bands.

Track listing

Additional releases 
The Get Up Kids re-released "Burned Bridges" on their B-sides collection Eudora.
Coalesce re-released "I'm Giving Up on This One" on the 2007 re-release of their album There Is Nothing New Under the Sun.

Personnel 
The Get Up Kids
Matt Pryor – vocals, guitar
Jim Suptic – guitar, backing vocals
Rob Pope – bass
Ryan Pope – drums

Coalesce
Sean Ingram – vocals
James Dewees – drums
Stacy Hilt – bass
Jes Steineger – guitar

References 

Coalesce (band) albums
The Get Up Kids EPs
Split EPs
1996 EPs